Dana Buchman was an upscale men's and women's fashion brand. Its founder, Dana Buchman, is an American fashion designer. The brand, which was most recently carried by Kohl's, was discontinued in 2020.

History

Dana Buchman has been a member of the Council of Fashion Designers of America since 1991 and is currently a board member of the CFDA.

In 2008, Buchman announced that she would be discontinuing her higher priced line to design exclusively for Kohl's. In 2011, Liz Claiborne sold the Dana Buchman brand to Kohl's. Kohl's carried the line until 2020, when it dropped the line along with seven other women's brands in a move toward activewear.

See also
Liz Claiborne
Mexx
Lucky Brand Jeans

References 

American fashion designers
Clothing brands of the United States
Companies based in New York City